This is a list of schools in Almaty, the largest city in the Central Asian country of Kazakhstan.  The list includes primary, secondary and tertiary schools.

International schools
International schools in Almaty include:

 Almaty International School
 Haileybury Almaty
 International College of Continuous Education (ICCE)
 Kazakhstan International School
 Miras International School, Almaty
 Republican Specialised Physics and Mathematics Boarding School
 Tien Shan International School (TSIS)
 Tamos Education International (TAMOS)

Other private schools
Other private schools in Almaty include:
 Arman School

Public schools
Public schools in Almaty include:

 School 8 - This school focuses on foreign languages.
 School 30
 School 35
 School 48 - This eleven-year school on Dostyk Street has a focus on aerospace, as symbolized by the rocket by its entrance.

  Nazarbayev Intellectual School PhM
  Nazarbayev Intellectual School Almaty ChB

See also

 List of universities in Kazakhstan
 Lists of schools

References

External links
 IB Program

Almaty Schools
Schools in Almaty
Almaty
Schools in Almaty
Almaty